Summit Group is one of the largest Bangladeshi conglomerates. The industries under this conglomerate include communication, trading, energy and power, shipping.

List of companies
 Summit Industrial & Mercantile Corporation (Pvt.) Ltd.
 Cosmopolitan Communications Limited.
 Cosmopolitan Traders (Pvt.) Ltd.
 Cosmopolitan Finance Ltd.
 Summit Power Limited.
 Summit Turbine Division.
 Summit Shipping Ltd.
 Summit Communications Ltd.
 Summit Alliance Port Limited
 United Summit Coastal Oil Ltd.
 Summit Asia Pacific Pte. Ltd.
 Resources & Solutions Ltd.
 Summit Developers Ltd.
 Summit Towers Ltd.

See also
 List of companies of Bangladesh

References

External links
 Summit Group's corporate information

Companies listed on the Chittagong Stock Exchange
Conglomerate companies of Bangladesh